West Oktibbeha County High School (WOCHS) was a public secondary school located in Maben, Mississippi. It was a part of the Oktibbeha County School District, formed by the consolidation of two high schools that had originally been segregated: formerly all-white Sturgis High School and the once all-black Maben High School.

In 2015 the schools of Oktibbeha County district consolidated into the Starkville Oktibbeha Consolidated School District, and this school consolidated into Starkville High School.

As of 2016 the site was abandoned.

References

External links
 
 
 

Schools in Oktibbeha County, Mississippi
Public high schools in Mississippi
2015 disestablishments in Mississippi
Educational institutions disestablished in 2015
Defunct schools in Mississippi